Hexagons is the second EP by British band Esben and the Witch released on Matador Records in 2011 as a digital download. Hexagons was quite well received Consequence of Sound said 'The one thing Esben and the Witch does remarkably well with Hexagons is establish a consistent, ghostly atmosphere right from the beginning and all the way through to the end with...', and Drowned in Sound said 'The Hexagons EP is undeniably portentous in both appearance and sound'.

Track listing
All songs by Esben and the Witch
The Fall - 2:39
The Flight - 4:15
The Surge - 3:06
The Still - 3:20
The Cast - 4:06
The Thaw - 2:03

Personnel
 Rachel Davies - Vocals, Bass
 Daniel Copeman - Guitars, Percussion
 Thomas Fisher - Guitars

References

2011 EPs
Esben and the Witch albums
Matador Records EPs